Canarana arguta is a species of beetle in the family Cerambycidae. It was described by Martins and Galileo in 2008. It is known from Brazil.

References

arguta
Beetles described in 2008